Otites approximata is a species of picture-winged fly in the genus Otites of the family Ulidiidae.

References

approximata